Top Gear Motorsport is a British television programme, covering various forms of motor racing, broadcast on BBC Two from 1994 to 1998. It was a spin-off programme from the popular motoring series Top Gear. The programme was presented by former Formula One driver and Top Gear presenter Tiff Needell. Other presenters were Penny Mallory, Tony Mason, Steve Berry, Mark James and Bob Constanduros.

The series covered a wide variety of motor racing categories, including the World Rally Championship, the British Rally Championship, British Formula Three, Formula Renault, and Formula Vauxhall Junior, British Superbikes, and Eurocars.

References

Motorsport
BBC Television shows
1994 British television series debuts
1998 British television series endings